Rohit Mirza (born 15 August 1991) is an Indian professional footballer who plays as a midfielder for Gokulam Kerala FC in the I-League.

Education
Rohit Mirza has a degree(B.E) in Electronics Engineering. He completed his Engineering from Fr.Conceicao Rodrigues College of Engineering, Bandra in 2013.

Career
Mirza joined Mumbai F.C. as a youth player who played for the under-20 squad in the I-League U20. Mirza then made his debut for the senior Mumbai side on 11 May 2013 in the club's final match of the season against Sporting Goa at the Tilak Maidan Stadium in Goa. He started and played 57 minutes, winning a penalty for his team  before being subbed off for Jayesh Rane as Mumbai drew the match 2–2.
Mirza was a part of ISL team 'Mumbai City FC' in ISL's Debut season 2014 Indian Super League season ,where he had 2 appearances for the team.
The following Year he was an integral part of Mumbai FC and helped the team survive relegation in key matches at the end of the season. 

Mirza then went on to play for Kenkre F.C in the I-League 2nd Division playoffs and scored 3 goals and made 2 assists in 9 matches. 

Following which he was a part of Mohun Bagan Athletic Club in the 2017-18 season and was loaned to Gokulam Kerala FC where he played a key role in the teams debut season till he faced a career threatening injury against East Bengal, cut his season short. He made a comeback with Gokulam Kerala FC in 10 months against Indian Arrows.

The next season he played for I-league Champions Chennai City FC in the I-league and AFC Cup.

Career statistics

References

1991 births
Living people
I-League players
Indian footballers
Mumbai FC players
Footballers from Mumbai
Indian Super League players
Association football midfielders
https://www.youtube.com/watch?v=qvZX5KKEvb8&t=7s